Malo Korrigan (full English title Malo Korrigan and the Space Tracers, French title Malo Korrigan et les Traceurs de l'espace) is a French animated television series with 26 episodes, created by Arthur Qwak and Norman J. LeBlanc of Futurikon.  It is a Futurikon - Tooncan - M6 Métropole Télévision - Canal J co-production and distributed by M6 Métropole Télévision. The English theme song is an original song composed for the TV series by Deep Forest. It was first aired in France during 2002; and later aired in the UK, Canada, Spain, Zimbabwe, Russia, Namibia, Kenya and on SABC1 in South Africa.

Synopsis
After a centuries long intergalactic war, peace finally reigns in the universe. More than 200 planets have joined together to form the Cosmocratic League with the aims of maintaining the peace and promoting the economic development of space. Interplanetary transport has become a vital service in maintaining the stability and unity of the League, with vast profits being made by some companies such as the powerful and ruthless Krill-Fireng Consortium. Only a handful of independents remain, rebellious and valuing their freedom, facing many dangers to deliver their cargo in record times. They are the Tracers, and the most famous of them all is Malo Korrigan and his crew aboard their ship, the Starduke.

Characters
Malo Korrigan

Voiced by: Alain Zouvi (French); Terrence Scammell (English)

A taciturn, but extremely gifted pilot, Malo Korrigan was one of the best in the Consortium's fleet. Condemned to a long jail term for opposing his employer's methods, he joined the Tracers on his release from prison. Like all the independent pilots, Korrigan is an enthusiastic defender of freedom, a mixture of adventurer and smuggler who sells his services to the highest bidder, carrying out perilous missions on the borders of the League. But, the captain of Starduke cannot prevent himself from helping weakest and regularly finishes his missions owing more than he did at the beginning.

Jonas Pequod

Voiced by: André Montmorency (French); Rick Jones (English)

Grumpy, but also generous and courageous, this veteran space navigator is a fan of rock'n'roll.  A do-it-yourself genius, he is able to repair almost anything, thanks to his flexible artificial hand.  It is therefore quite natural that he would become the Starduke's engineer.  The only problem is that Jonas is also the cook, and in that he is far from successful.

Cyana Baahra 

Voiced by: Manon Arsenault (French); Eleanor Noble (English)

Although she is a genuine alien princess and young graduate of the Federal Academy of Space Navigation, Cyana chose to become a pilot with the Tracers.  Hired by Malo Korrigan, Cyana wonders if she is worthy of the confidence placed in her by Malo and Jonas.  An expert fighter and highly intelligent, she takes enormous risks to please her friends and satisfy her own curiosity. Even if she doesn't always understand the mentality of rebels, like all Tracers, Cyana would prefer to fight the injustices she sees.

Yago Carcharias

Voiced by: Luis de Cespedes (French; English)

A man without scruples, Carcharias is the chief henchman of the Consortium.  Cruel and relentless, he is a true predator without compassion, responsible for the dirtiest operations.  Intelligent, and therefore dangerous, Carcharias does not accept failure or defeat by the Tracers and in particular by Malo Korrigan.  Only the obligation to save face in the eyes of the federal authorities, temper his will to do harm.

Episodes

References

External links
Official website
IMDB page

French children's animated science fiction television series
2000s French animated television series